Nikolay Nikolayevich Chernetskiy (born 29 November 1959 in Frunze, Kirghiz SSR) is a retired track and field sprinter from the Soviet Union.

He is known for winning the gold medal in the men's 4 × 400 metres relay at the 1980 Summer Olympics and at the inaugural 1983 World Championships (with Aleksandr Troshchilo, Sergey Lovachov, and Viktor Markin, clocking a total time of 3:00.79 min).

He trained at Armed Forces sports society in Moscow.

References

External links
 
 
 

1959 births
Living people
Soviet male sprinters
Russian male sprinters
Athletes (track and field) at the 1980 Summer Olympics
Olympic athletes of the Soviet Union
Olympic gold medalists for the Soviet Union
Sportspeople from Bishkek
World Athletics Championships medalists
World Athletics Championships athletes for the Soviet Union
Medalists at the 1980 Summer Olympics
Olympic gold medalists in athletics (track and field)
Honoured Masters of Sport of the USSR
World Athletics Championships winners